This is a list of Koryo-saram, also known as Soviet Koreans—the descendants of Korean immigrants to the Russian Far East who were deported to Central Asia in 1937.

In academia
Viktor Aleksandrovich Em, Professor, Doctor of Economy, Head of Tashkent Institute of Irrigation and Melioration.
German Kim, head of the Department of Korean Studies at Al-Farabi University, Kazakhstan, and a leading scholar in the history of Koryo saram.
Boris Dmitrievich Pak, Professor, Doctor of Historical Sciences, Honored Scientific Worker of Russian Federation, academician of Russian Academy of Humanities, Main Research Scholar Institute of Oriental Studies Russian Academy of Sciences.
Bella Borisovna Pak,  the first Russian Korean woman - Doctor of Historical Sciences, Leading Research Scholar Institute of Oriental Studies Russian Academy of Sciences, the chief editor of the series "Russian Koreans.".
Andrey Insunovich Pak, Uzbekistani geologist of Koryo-saram descent, Doctor of Geological and Mineralogical Sciences, Lenin Prize winner.

In business
Tatyana Bakalchuk, Russian businesswoman of Korean ethnicity, founder of Wildberries
Vladimir Kim, billionaire businessman from Kazakhstan

In cultural fields
Alexander Kan, North Korea-born Russian-language fiction writer, born in Pyongyang, North Korea.
Anatoly Andreevich Kim, Russian-language fiction writer.
Gennady Kim, Uzbekistan-born Kazakhstan guitarist, composer.
Gong Cha, Mun, Russian-born Kazakhstan singer.
Katya Jones, Russian/British dancer. 
Marina Kim, TV news anchor and journalist. (Korean father) 
Mikhail Pak, Russian novelist.
Roman Kim, one of the top contestants on Kazakhstani entertainment programme SuperStar KZ.
Yuliy Kim, singer-songwriter. (Korean father) 
Aleksandr Khvan, Russian film director and actor. (Korean father) 
Dragon Lee (Vyachaslev Yaksysnyi/Вячеслав Ясинский), actor and practitioner of Taekwondo and hapkido, born in North Korea.
Pavlo Lee "Pasha Lee" (Павло Романович Лі), Ukrainian actor and television presenter, son of a Koryo-saram father and a Russian mother
Lyudmila Nam, Kazakhstan-born Russian mezzo-soprano.
Nikolai Shin, Uzbekistani painter.
Lavrenti Son, Russian and Korean-language playwright.
Anita Tsoy, popular singer-songwriter.
Sergey Tsoy, Russian violinist.
Viktor Tsoi, son of a Koryo-saram father and a Russian mother, lead singer of the Russian band Kino and a major figure in the development of the Soviet rock scene in the 1980s.
Ting Hai-Lun, (Khay) Singer with the Qpop group Mad Men (Korean-Chinese descent)
Roman Park, (Aron) Rapper with the Qpop group Mad Men (Korean-Russian descent)
Polina Bogusevich, singer, winner of the Junior Eurovision Song Contest 2017
Lomon (Park Solomon), Uzbekistan-born South Korean actor (later on chose South Korean nationality).
Yury Park, Uzbekistan-born South Korean model, former Produce X 101 contestant (rank 42th).
Kika Kim, Tiktok Star

In military
Yury Pavlovich Em, Russian Major General, Hero of the Russian Federation (conferred May 6, 2000). His father, Dyun Wo Em, is a recipient of the Order of the Red Banner.
Yevgeny Ivanovich Kim (February 27, 1932—November 1998), KGB colonel. Once Hero of the Soviet Union (conferred December 21, 1987; Ukaz № 11562).
Vyacheslav Il'ich Kim, Russian Major General, Deputy Commander of the Black Sea Fleet.
Aleksandr Pavlovich Min, Soviet military captain. Once Hero of the Soviet Union (conferred Mar 24, 1945) and Order of Lenin recipient.
Oleg Grigoryevich Tsoy, Soviet Air Force officer and test pilot, Hero of the Russian Federation (conferred Apr 16, 1997; Ukaz № 358).
Boris Yugai, Kyrgyz Chief of the General Staff.

In politics
Alexey Tsoi, Kazakhstani politician who is serving as the Minister of Healthcare
Vitaly Fen, Uzbekistan's ambassador to South Korea since November 12, 1999.
Valery Kan, the youngest person ever elected to the Ussuriysk Duma.
Alexandra Kim, the first Korean communist.
Kim Pen Hwa (Ким Пен Хва /김병화), twice Hero of Socialist Labor and four times Order of Lenin recipient.
Kim Jong-il, born Yuri Irsenovich Kim (Юрий Ирсенович Ким/김정일/金正日), supreme leader of North Korea (1994-2011)
Georgy Vladimirovich Kim, former Minister of Justice of the Republic of Kazakhstan (January 29, 2002February 25, 2003). Now deputy Prosecutor General – Chairman of the Committee on Legal Statistics and Special Accounting of the Republic of Kazakhstan.
Mikhail Kim, delegate to the 17th Congress of the Communist Party of the Soviet Union .
Oleksandr Sin, Ukrainian politician who was Mayor of Zaporizhia from late 2010 till late 2015.
Sergey Tsoy, Moscow Mayor press-secretary
Ljubomir Tyan, State Duma member, agricultural businessman
Vitaliy Kim, Ukrainian politician, Governor of Mykolaiv Oblast (Korean father)

In sports
Mikhail An, Soviet international footballer.
Dmitry Bivol, Russian boxer, WBA light-heavyweight champion, of Moldovan and Korean descent. 
Gennady Golovkin, Kazakhstani boxer, WBA and IBO middleweight champion, son of a Russian father and Korean mother
Alexey Kim, chess grandmaster of Koryo-saram descent.
Nellie Kim, Olympic gold medal gymnast, born to a Korean father and Tatar mother.
Sergey Lim, Uzbekistani and Kazakhstani judo and sambo player.
Eduard Son, Soviet footballer, Soviet Top League champion in 1988
Denis Ten, Kazakhstani Olympic figure skater.
Kostya Tszyu, Australian boxer of Russian, Korean and Mongol descent.
Sergey Tsoy, Uzbekistani Olympic swimmer.
Igor Son, a Kazakhstani Olympic weightlifter.

References 

 
 
Overseas Korean groups
Lists of Korean people
Koryo-saram